CRITICOM(M) is an abbreviation for "Critical Intelligence Communications [System]" q.v. National Security Agency (NSA) former flash-intelligence alert and warning system.  N.B. The official intelligence-community (IC) abbreviation uses two Ms.

The Critical Intelligence Communications network, or CRITICOMM, is designed to flash to the American President and a handful of other senior officials intelligence alerts and warnings of the highest priority—an imminent coup in a Middle East sheikdom, for example, or the assassination of a world leader, or the sinking of a Soviet sub.  It is the goal of NSA to have such a CRITIC message on the President's desk within ten minutes of the event.  An example of a CRITIC message being sent is the USS Pueblo that was captured by North Korea.  The USS Pueblo's CRITIC message was sent by Don McClarren CTO-2.(1)

. . . . In 1973 NSA's CRITICOM/SPINTCOM network was transformed into the Digital Network-Defense Special Security Communications System (DIN/DSCSS), which fully integrated the message traffic into the Defense Department's general service AUTODIN network (automatic digital network).

Sources
, USS Pueblo (AGER-2)
The Puzzle Palace, A Report on America's Most Secret Agency, by James Bamford, Houghton Mifflin 1982,p104
CIA Insider's Dictionary of US and Foreign Intelligence, Counterintelligence and Tradecraft, edited by Leo D. Carl, NIBC Press, Washington, DC

National Security Agency